John Harris (born 1959) is a former American slalom canoeist who competed in the 1980s. He won two medals in the C-2 team event at the ICF Canoe Slalom World Championships with a silver in 1983 and a bronze in 1985.

References

External links 
 John HARRIS at CanoeSlalom.net

American male canoeists
Living people
1959 births
Medalists at the ICF Canoe Slalom World Championships